The Chromadorea are a class of the roundworm phylum, Nematoda. They contain a single subclass (Chromadoria) and several orders. With such a redundant arrangement, the Chromadoria are liable to be divided if the orders are found to form several clades, or abandoned if they are found to constitute a single radiation.

Formerly, they were treated as a subclass in the paraphyletic "Adenophorea" assemblage, which has been mostly abandoned by modern authors. It is also suspected that the Chromadorea may not be monophyletic as delimited here; at least the Monhysterida seem to be a distinct and far more ancient lineage than the rest.

Members of this class' bodies usually have annules, their amphids elaborate and spiral, and they all have three esophageal glands. They usually live in marine sediments, although they can live elsewhere. They have a more sophisticated pharynx than most roundworms.

Members of this class can be identified by the presence of eight conserved signature indels (CSIs) exclusively shared by the class. These molecular markers are found in essential proteins such as tRNA (guanine-N(1))-methyltransferase and can serve as a reliable molecular method of distinguishing the Chromadorea from other classes within the phylum Nematoda.

Orders

Provisionally, the following orders are placed here:

 Araeolaimida
 Ascaridida
 Chromadorida
 Desmodorida
 Desmoscolecida
 Monhysterida
 Rhabditida
 Rhigonematida

Notes 

The Benthimermithida are also occasionally placed here.

The Ascaridida appear to be nested within Rhabditida.

A part of the Nematoda phylum, one of the nine main phyla. Along with other certain species of roundworms.

Most frequently related to other main species of roundworms such as Earthworms, Pinworms, Hookworms, and Stongyloides.

References

External links 

  (2002): Nematoda. Version of 2002-JAN-01. Retrieved 2008-NOV-02.

 
Protostome classes